The 2000 CSKA season was the club's ninth season in the Russian Top Division, the highest tier of association football in Russia.

Squad

Transfers

In:

Out:

Competitions

Top Division

Results by round

Results

Table

Russian Cup

1999-2000

2000-01

UEFA Cup

First round

Squad Statistics

Appearances and goals

|-
|colspan="14"|Players out on loan:

|-
|colspan="14"|Players who left CSKA Moscow during the season:

|}

Goal Scorers

Disciplinary Record

References

PFC CSKA Moscow seasons
CSKA Moscow